Montserrat Martin Moncusi (born 26 July 1966 in Montblanc) is a Spanish former archer.

Archery
She competed at the World Archery Championships in  1983 and 1985 finishing 64th and 34th respectively.

At the 1984 Summer Olympic Games she came 28th with 2418 points in the women's individual event.

Martin retired in 1992. She later was awarded an "Insignia de oro y brillantes" from the Real Federación Española de Tiro con Arco.

References

External links 
 Profile on worldarchery.org

1966 births
Living people
Spanish female archers
Olympic archers of Spain
Archers at the 1984 Summer Olympics
People from Conca de Barberà
Sportspeople from the Province of Tarragona